State Highway 11 (abbreviated SH-11) is a state highway in Oklahoma. There is one letter-suffixed spur highway branching from SH-11, SH-11A.

Route description
From its beginning at US-281, SH-11 travels east through the town of Capron.  later, it reaches SH-8. SH-8 / SH-11 meet SH-58 three miles (5 km) east of Burlington, and turn south, forming a three-route concurrency. The combined route passes through the unincorporated community of Driftwood and intersects US-64 just west of the town of Ingersoll. At this point, SH-11 turns to the east, leaving SH-8 and SH-58.

SH-11 passes through the northern part of Great Salt Plains State Park, and after , intersects with SH-38. SH-11 continues on another seven miles (11 km), before intersecting with SH-132. Six miles to the east, SH-11's only spur route, SH-11A, branches off to the north, connecting to the town of Wakita. SH-11 travels another  to the east, intersecting US-81 in Medford, the seat of Grant County. After leaving Medford, SH-11 runs another  to the east, passing through Numa (unincorporated), before its junction with SH-74.

After , SH-11 passes through Kaw City, and crosses Kaw Lake, then runs another  to SH-18, in Shidler.

Just east of Burbank, SH-11 leaves SH-18 for a  concurrency with US-60 across the rolling Osage prairie to Pawhuska, the seat of Osage County. SH-11 then turns south on a five-mile (8 km) concurrency with SH-99, then turns back to the east, passing through more rugged terrain, through Pershing and Tallant (both unincorporated), before entering the oil town of Barnsdall  later.

Just east of Barnsdall, SH-11 serves as the southern terminus of SH-123, which connects to Woolaroc Museum. SH-11 then heads roughly southeast, through Wolco (unincorporated), and skirts Avant, turning due south upon entering Tulsa County, before intersecting SH-20 on the east end of Skiatook.

After leaving Skiatook, SH-11 continues south as Cincinnati Avenue in Tulsa County, and  later, doglegs a mile to the east at Sperry. SH-11 then resumes its path to the south as Peoria Avenue, passes through Turley (unincorporated), and enters the city of Tulsa at 56th Street North. SH-11 is a four-lane arterial street along Peoria Avenue, and at 36th Street North, turns to the east, going 1½ miles to US-75, the Cherokee Expressway. SH-11 briefly overlaps southbound US-75, then turns back to the east as the Gilcrease Expressway, passing by Tulsa International Airport before arcing back to the south. It then reaches its eastern terminus at I-244 / US-412 in east Tulsa.

SH-11A

State Highway 11A is a short state highway in Grant County.

Junction list

References

011
Transportation in Tulsa, Oklahoma
Transportation in Woods County, Oklahoma
Transportation in Alfalfa County, Oklahoma
Transportation in Grant County, Oklahoma
Transportation in Kay County, Oklahoma
Transportation in Osage County, Oklahoma
Transportation in Washington County, Oklahoma
Transportation in Tulsa County, Oklahoma